De Vriendt or de Vriendt is a Dutch-language surname.  People with this surname include:

 Albrecht De Vriendt (1843–1900), a Belgian painter
 Cornelis Floris de Vriendt (1514–1575), a Flemish sculptor, print artist and architect
 Frans Floris de Vriendt (1517–1 October 1570), a Flemish painter
 Jan Frans De Vriendt (1829–1919), a Belgian sculptor
 Maximiliaan de Vriendt, (1559–1614), a new Latin poet and a civic office-holder in the city of Ghent
 Wouter De Vriendt, (born 1977), a Belgian politician

Dutch-language surnames